Steinle is a German-language surname. Notable people with the surname include:

 Eduard Von Steinle (1810–1886), an Austrian painter
 Roland J. Steinle (1896–1966), an American judge
 Ulla Steinle, a West German canoeist
 Moritz Steinle (born 1983), a German footballer
 Kathryn Steinle (19822015), an American woman fatally shot by an illegal alien in 2015

See also 

 Steinle Turret Machine Company, a historic building in Madison, Wisconsin

German-language surnames